The 1973 Carling Can-Am was the second round of the 1973 Can-Am season.  It was held July 8, 1973, at Road Atlanta in Braselton, Georgia.  It was the fourth Can-Am race held at the track.

Results
Pole position: Mark Donohue, 1:12.950
Fastest lap: Mark Donohue, 1:14
Race distance:  in two heats
Winner's average speed:

External links
Race results from World Sports Racing Prototypes
Race results from Ultimate Racing History

Road Atlanta
Road Atlanta Can-Am
1973 in sports in Georgia (U.S. state)